Two ships of the Royal Navy have been named HMS Nasturtium:

  was an  launched in 1915 and sunk in 1916
  was a  ordered as La Paimpolaise by the French Navy she was taken over in 1940 and renamed. She was sold to Greece in 1948 and renamed Cania
 

Royal Navy ship names